Moresby Island is an island on the Peros Banhos Atoll in the Chagos Archipelago of the British Indian Ocean Territory.

References

Important Bird Areas of the British Indian Ocean Territory
Chagos Archipelago